Ephraim Bateman (July 9, 1780January 28, 1829) represented New Jersey in the United States Senate from 1826 to 1829 and in the United States House of Representatives from 1815 to 1823.

Born in Cedarville, New Jersey, an area within Lawrence Township, Cumberland County, New Jersey; attended the local schools and Nathaniel Ogden's Latin school; apprenticed as a tailor in 1796; taught in the local school 1799–1801; studied medicine with a physician in 1801 and at the University of Pennsylvania in 1802 and 1803; practiced in Cedarville

Member of the New Jersey General Assembly 1808–1809, 1811, and 1813, serving as speaker in 1813; elected to the Fourteenth United States Congress and to the three succeeding Congresses (March 4, 1815 – March 3, 1823).

Member, New Jersey Legislative Council 1826 and served as president; elected to the United States Senate to fill the vacancy caused by the death of Joseph McIlvaine and served from November 9, 1826 to January 12, 1829, when he resigned because of failing health. His election to the Senate was contested by several members of the New Jersey Legislature and citizens, citing that Bateman, while presiding over the joint election meeting, cast the deciding vote for himself against Theodore Frelinghuysen. A select committee investigated the issue and declared the election legal.

He died in Cedarville, Cumberland County, New Jersey, aged 48; interred in the Old Stone Church Cemetery, Fairfield Township, Cumberland County, New Jersey.

References

External links

Ephraim Bateman at The Political Graveyard

1780 births
1829 deaths
People from Lawrence Township, Cumberland County, New Jersey
American people of English descent
Democratic-Republican Party members of the United States House of Representatives from New Jersey
New Jersey National Republicans
National Republican Party United States senators from New Jersey
Members of the New Jersey Legislative Council
Speakers of the New Jersey General Assembly
Members of the New Jersey General Assembly
Educators from New Jersey
Physicians from New Jersey
American tailors
University of Pennsylvania alumni
19th-century American educators